The Madeira School (simply referred to as Madeira School or Madeira) is an elite, private, day and boarding college-preparatory school for girls in McLean, Virginia, United States. It was established in 1906 by Lucy Madeira Wing.

History 
Originally located on 19th Street near Dupont Circle in Washington, D.C., it was founded by Lucy Madeira Wing (1873–1961) in 1906 and moved to the Northern Virginia suburb of McLean in 1931.

Since 1931, its campus has grown beyond the original campus buildings—Main, the dining hall, Schoolhouse, East, West, and North South Dorms, The Land, the Annex (infirmary), and the two gatehouses at the entrance to the Oval—to include the Chapel/Auditorium, the indoor riding ring and Gaines Hall, the science building, a renovated and expanded dining hall, Hurd Sports Center, and Huffington Library.

In 1973, a fourteen-year-old student was found dead on the school grounds due to shock and exposure. An individual, already convicted two years earlier for another sexual assault perpetrated at the school, was eventually convicted of first degree murder and abduction with intent to defile in connection with the death.

In 1980 the then headmistress Jean Harris was convicted for the murder of Herman Tarnower.

Demographics 
The demographic breakdown of the 310 girls enrolled in 2013–2014 was:
 Native American/Alaskan - 0.7%
 Asian/Pacific islanders - 21.6%
 Black - 13.9%
 Hispanic - 3.5%
 White - 55.5%
 Multiracial - 4.8%

Campus and facilities 
The campus is on  overlooking the Potomac River (McLean, Virginia) and consists of 34 separate buildings.

Public access 
The Madeira school has had many disputes over the use of its land. In 1966, Fairfax County proposed the turning of 208 of Madeira's privately owned  into public park land. In 1991 Madeira gave a trail easement along Georgetown Pike, as well as $89,000 for that trail construction to complete the Potomac Heritage Route without visitors entering the main area of the campus. However, this trail was never completed by the park officials. In 2008, the Fairfax County government attempted to obtain from Madeira an easement near the Potomac River to permit the completion of a  loop of walking trails as a condition of approval for the school's proposed expansion plans. This one-mile (1.6 km)-long trail section through Madeira's property would connect the county's Scott's Run Park to Great Falls National Park. The Madeira School declined this easement, citing concerns about safety and environmental impacts.

Notable alumnae 

 Brooke Astor, philanthropist, socialite, and writer
 Mary Lincoln Beckwith, descendant of Abraham Lincoln
 Stephania Bell, physical therapist and commentator
 Christina Bellin, model and socialite
 Clara López, former Colombian minister of labour.
 Blair Brown, actress
 Campbell Brown, anchor and news reporter
 Mika Brzezinski, journalist, talk show host, commentator, and author
 Charlotte E. Carr, labor activist and state official
 Stockard Channing, actress
 Penny Chenery, sportswoman
 Julia Collins, most successful female Jeopardy! contestant
 Hope Cooke, Queen consort of the 12th Chogyal of Sikkim
 Kathryn Wasserman Davis, philanthropist and scholar of world affairs
 Helen T. Edwards, physicist
 Katharine Graham, publisher
 Mary Helen Wright Greuter, astronomer and historian
 Cornelia Stuyvesant Vanderbilt, heiress
 Rory Kennedy, documentary filmmaker
 Kui Kinyanjui, journalist
 Alex Kuczynski, author and journalist
 Eleanor de Laittre, artist
 Diana Oughton, social activist
 Patricia Phelps de Cisneros, art collector and philanthropist
 Naomi Pierce, evolutionary biologist
 Martha Reeves (anchorite), Anglican solitary and author
 Alice Rivlin, economist and budget official
 Carrie Southworth, actress and model
 Frances Sternhagen, actress
 Ruth Carter Stevenson, patron of the arts
 Lally Weymouth, journalist
 Meredith Whitney, businesswoman

Notable faculty 
 Kate Clifton Osgood Holmes, painter
 Anne Truitt, sculptor and author

References

External links

McLean, Virginia
High schools in Fairfax County, Virginia
Private high schools in Virginia
Boarding schools in Virginia
Preparatory schools in Virginia
Girls' schools in Virginia
Independent School League

Educational institutions established in 1906
1906 establishments in Virginia